This article lists events from the year 2019 in Croatia.

Incumbents
 President – Kolinda Grabar-Kitarović 
 Prime Minister – Andrej Plenković
 Speaker – Gordan Jandroković

Events 
 5–6 January – Snow Queen Trophy in Zagreb
 2 August – 2019 Zagreb shooting
 26–29 September – 2019 ABA League Supercup in Zagreb

Deaths

January
 1 January
 Franjo Emanuel Hoško, Catholic priest (b. 1940) 
 Ivo Gregurević, actor (b. 1952)
 27 January – Robert Budak, actor (b. 1992)

April 
 3 April – Josip Zovko, actor (b. 1970)  
 16 April – Bazilije Pandžić, Croatian historian, archivist and orientalist (b. 1918)
 19 April – Zora Dirnbach, Croatian journalist and writer (b. 1929)
 29 April – Štefica Krištof, bowling champion (b. 1936)

May
 23 May – Zlatko Škorić, football goalkeeper (b. 1941) 
 30 May – Ante Sirković, football goalkeeper (b. 1944)
 31 May – Đelo Jusić, composer (b. 1939)

June
 3 June – Jurica Jerković, footballer (b. 1950)

July
 4 July – Dorica Nikolić, politician (b. 1948)
 5 July – Josip Braovac, actor (b. 1987)

August
 10 August – Radoslav Katičić, linguist (b. 1930)
 14 August – Ivo Malec, composer and conductor (b. 1925)
 18 August – Denis Kuljiš, journalist (b. 1951)

October
 26 October – Ante Matošić, water polo player (b. 1940)

November
 12 November 
 Martin Sagner, actor (b. 1932)
 Mani Gotovac, critic, playwright, theatrologist and writer (b. 1939)
 14 November – Branko Lustig, film producer (b. 1932)

December
 25 December – Aleksandar Bogdanović, actor (b. 1974)

References

External links
 

 
2010s in Croatia
Years of the 21st century in Croatia
Croatia
Croatia